Lucrecia Bobuiche Boabaila (born 26 March 1998), also known simply as Lucrecia, is an Equatorial Guinean footballer who plays as a goalkeeper for the Equatorial Guinea women's national team.

Club career
Bobuiche has played for Estrella de Rebola in Equatorial Guinea.

International career
Bobuiche capped for Equatorial Guinea at senior level during the 2018 Africa Women Cup of Nations, playing in one match.

References

1998 births
Living people
Equatoguinean women's footballers
Women's association football goalkeepers
Equatorial Guinea women's international footballers
Bubi people